Marchmont is a residential area of Edinburgh, named for the then landowner, the Earl of Marchmont.

Marchmont may also refer to:

Places
Marchmont, an archaic name for Roxburgh Castle, from which the following take their name
Marchmont House, in Berwickshire
Marchmont Estate, in Berwickshire
A community of the Severn, Ontario, township
Marchmont, New South Wales

Given names
Marchmont Nedham, writer, publisher, and political commentator of the middle seventeenth century
Marchmont Schwartz (1909–1991), college football head coach at Stanford

Other
 Earl of Marchmont, a title in the Peerage of Scotland
 Edith Marchmont, a female sleuth written by Julius Chambers
 Marchmont Herald, a Scottish officer of arms at the Court of the Lord Lyon King of Arms
 Marchmont (novel), a novel by Charlotte Turner Smith
 , a British cargo ship in service 1947–52

See also
 Marchment, surname